XHECO-FM is a radio station on 90.5 FM in Tecomán, Colima, Mexico. The station is owned by Radiorama and carries the La Bestia Grupera grupera format.

History
XHECO received its concession on April 7, 1993; it was originally located on 88.9 MHz and owned by Héctor Manuel Vielma Valdivia. In 1998, it was sold to Limón, S.A. de C.V. and then to Radiorama in 2003.

References

Radio stations in Colima